The 11th Trampoline World Championships were held in Brig, Switzerland on 27 September 1980.

Results

Men

Trampoline

Trampoline Synchro

Double Mini Trampoline

Tumbling

Women

Trampoline

Trampoline Synchro

Double Mini Trampoline

Tumbling

References
 Trampoline UK

Trampoline World Championships
Trampoline Gymnastics World Championships
1980 in Swiss sport
International gymnastics competitions hosted by Switzerland